Kampimoseiulella is a genus of mites in the Phytoseiidae family.

Species
 Kampimoseiulella altusus (van der Merwe, 1968)
 Kampimoseiulella reburrus (van der Merwe, 1968)

References

Phytoseiidae